Adcare Hospital is a hospital in Worcester, Massachusetts with 114 beds. It is a substance abuse hospital. It is a voluntary hospital. It also has an inpatient hospital in Rhode Island. It has many outpatient clinics. Adcare has criminal justice services.  It is accredited by the Joint Commission.

Acute Residential Programs 
Rehabilitation and the Acute Residential programs provide the structure and treatment needed to support a healthy and ongoing recovery. The program offers a full range of clinical services to stabilize health and engage individuals in treatment and aftercare, including:

 Individual counseling
 Group therapy
 Expressive therapy
 Psycho-education groups
 Family integration into treatment
 Access to individual and family aftercare resources
 Family day 1x per month

External links

References

Hospitals in Worcester, Massachusetts
Hospitals established in 1984